Ahmed Tabrez Shams Chowdhury SBP, BSP, ndc, psc is a Lieutenant General of Bangladesh Army and General Officer Commanding of the Army Training and Doctrine Command. Prior to that, he was Director General of Directorate General of Forces Intelligence. He is the former General Officer Commanding (GOC) of the 10th Infantry Division (Ramu) and Area Commander, Cox’s Bazar Area and 33rd Infantry Division (Cumilla) and Area Commander, Cumilla Area.

Career
Chowdhury had served as the Area Commander of Cumilla Area and General Officer Commanding of the 33rd Infantry Division from 2018 to 2020. In October 2018, Chowdhury was the chief guest at the Bangladesh Army Volleyball tournament held in Comilla Cantonment.

After Cumilla, He was appointed as the General Officer Commanding of the 10th Infantry Division and Area Commander, Cox’s Bazar Area, Ramu Cantonment. On 3 December 2020, he received General Aziz Ahmed, Chief of army staff, at Ramu Cantonment who had come to observe the flag raising ceremony of four units at the newly established Ramu Cantonment. The four units were Bangladesh Army Station Headquarters at Ramu, Combined Military Hospital, 10the Field Intelligence Unit, and Static Signal Company.

On 5 July 2021, Chowdhury was appointed the Director General of Directorate General of Forces Intelligence. The former Director General of Directorate General of Forces Intelligence, Md Saiful Alam, was appointed the Quarter Master General of the Bangladesh Army. During his term at the DGFI, a secret has been revealed that since long time DGFI is operating a secret prison called Aynaghar.

On 26 October 2022, Chowdhury was promoted to the rank of Lieutenant General and he posted to the Army Training and Doctrine Command (ARTDOC) in Mymensingh Cantonment. Major General Hamidul Haque replaced him as  Director General of Directorate General of Forces Intelligence.

References

Living people
Bangladesh Army generals
Directors General of the Directorate General of Forces Intelligence
1967 births